Andy  Day (born 15 May 1981) is an English actor, comedian, singer, dancer, songwriter and television presenter. He is best known for his work on the BBC's CBeebies channel. He is also a patron of Anti-Bullying Week.
He was first on Friendly TV in 2005 and moved to CBeebies in 2007, becoming the longest serving presenter in 2018.

CBeebies 
Day is the longest-serving CBeebies presenter having presented programmes and links since July 2007. He particularly specialises in shows about animals and nature, including:

Greatest Dinosaurs
Epic Chases
Cutest Moments
Epic Fails
Backpack Finds
Talking Machine
Epic Houses
Andy's Dinosaur Adventures
Andy's Secret Hideout
Andy's Wild Workouts
Andy's Baby Animals
Andy's Safari Adventures
Andy's Prehistoric Adventures
Andy's Aquatic Adventures 
Andy And The Band (originally on CBBC)
Andy's Dinosaur Toybox
Andy's Global Adventures

Day has taken part in the CBeebies Live Arena Tour every year since 2012, and played in the Edinburgh Festival in 2009. He was nominated as Best Presenter at the 2009 BAFTA Children's Awards.

Other work 
In addition to Day's work on television with the children's channel CBeebies, Day also hosted a school radio broadcast for reception age children, entitled "Playtime". He hosted this show until 2017, when the broadcaster Steven Kynman took over.

Andy and the Odd Socks 
Day also fronts a pop-rock band that makes songs for children, called Andy and the Odd Socks. Originally a studio-based project with Andy and the music producers Rob David and Dan Delor, a full band was formed to enable Andy to perform the songs live (rather than to a backing track as he'd previously done with his Dinosaur Rap performances). The full band was first formed in June 2017 at the Glastonbury festival and have performed at other festivals since.
In 2020 they formed the central characters of a CBBC TV show 'Andy and the Band', where the band would help solve fictional fan issues in a manner similar to The Monkees in their TV show, performing older songs and some specifically written for the series (once again, by Day, David and Delor).

They have released 3 studio albums.

Who Invited This Lot? (2017)

Who's In The Odd Socks? (2020)

Odd Socks Calling (2022)

The band features:

Holly Mallett (as Moxy) drums

Marcus Ramtohul (as Blu) bass guitar

Stewart McCheyene (as Cousin Mac) keyboards

Marcelo Cervone (as Rio) lead guitar

There used to be another pianist in the band playing the role of "Random Keith" whose real name is still unknown and was replaced by Mac in early 2018.

References

1981 births
Living people
BBC television presenters
English male television actors
English television presenters
Male actors from Bedfordshire
People from Luton